Searchlight is an unincorporated town and census-designated place (CDP) in Clark County, Nevada, United States, at the topographic saddle between two mountain ranges. At the 2020 census it had a population of 445.

History
According to U.S. Senator Harry Reid (1939-2021), who wrote extensively about his hometown, the most likely story as to how the town received its name was that when George Frederick Colton was looking for gold in the area on May 6, 1897, he supposedly said that it would take a searchlight to find gold ore there. Shortly thereafter, he found gold, leading to a boom era when Searchlight had a larger population than Las Vegas. At the time, it was in Lincoln County, Nevada. As talk surfaced for carving Clark County, Nevada out of Lincoln County, Searchlight was initially considered to be the county seat. Between 1907 and 1910, the gold mines produced $7 million in gold and other precious minerals, and the town had a population of about 1,500. The ore was shipped to Barnwell via the Barnwell and Searchlight Railway.

Other stories on the origin of the name include a story that Colton was lighting a Searchlight brand match when he discovered the gold ore. Reid dismissed this story, saying that the Searchlight matches were not available in 1898. Yet another story says that Colton thought the area would be a good place because it was on a hill. His mine was called the Duplex, because the gold ore was found on two levels.

Searchlight declined after 1917 but remained as a stop on the Arrowhead Highway. In 1927, U.S. Route 91 bypassed the town and its population dropped to 50.

The town had a resurgence in the 1930s and 1940s with the construction of the nearby Hoover Dam and was the site the El Rey Bordello in the 1940s and early 1950s until it burned down. The last gold mine ceased operating around 1953.

Geography

Climate
The city experiences a desert climate (Köppen: BWh) with hot summers and cool winters, but it is not uncommon to see temperatures below freezing.  Searchlight's elevation makes temperatures somewhat cooler than lower-elevation areas in the Mojave Desert, such as Baker, California; Needles, California; and Fort Mohave, Arizona. However, summers can still be extremely hot. Due to Searchlight's altitude and aridity, temperatures drop quickly after sunset, especially in the summer.  Daytime highs in the winter are usually well above freezing, and nighttime lows drop below freezing only a few nights a year.

Demographics

At the 2000 census, there were 576 people, 315 households and 136 families residing in the CDP. The racial make-up of the CDP was 95.0% White, 0.7% African American, 0.7% Native American, 0.2% Asian, 0.2% Pacific Islander, 1.7% from other races and 1.6% from two or more races. Hispanic or Latino of any race were 3.7% of the population.

There are 315 households, of which 8.6% had children under the age of 18 living with them, 34.9% were married couples living together, 5.1% had a female householder with no husband present and 56.8% were non-families. 48.3% of all households were made up of individuals, and 23.5% had someone living alone who was 65 years of age or older. The average household size was 1.76 and the average family size was 2.46.

10.1% of the population were under the age of 18, 3.1% from 18 to 24, 20.0% from 25 to 44, 35.8% from 45 to 64 and 31.1% were 65 years of age or older. The median age was 55 years. For every 100 females, there were 125.9 males. For every 100 females age 18 and over, there were 131.3 males.

The median household income was $24,407 and the medianfamily  income was $29,323. Males had a median income of $26,563 and females $27,868. The per capita income was $19,606. None of the household families were living below the poverty line, with just 14.6% of the population comprising that, including no one under age 18 and none of those over 64.

Education
Public education in Searchlight is administered by Clark County School District. The district operates Reid Elementary School (K–5) in Searchlight.

Searchlight has a public library, a branch of the Las Vegas-Clark County Library District.

Transportation
The Silver Rider Transit operates express buses between Laughlin, Searchlight and Las Vegas. Private shuttle companies connect Searchlight with Harry Reid International Airport in Las Vegas.

Notable people
 Rex Bell, westerns actor and politician. Owned the Walking Box Ranch with his wife Clara Bow. The ranch was a popular destination for Hollywood actors.
 Edith Head, costume designer who won more Oscars than any other woman.
 William Harrell Nellis, aviator for whom Nellis Air Force Base is named
 Harry Reid, United States senator, 1987–2017, senate majority leader, 2007-2015

In popular culture
In 1907, the "Searchlight Rag" by Scott Joplin was published. In the early 1890s, Joplin's friends, the brothers Tom and Charles Turpin, had been prospecting in the Searchlight area. Their frequent stories of this experience, recounted to the patrons of their bar, inspired the title of the rag.

See also
 Barnwell and Searchlight Railway
 LORAN-C transmitter Searchlight
 Searchlight Airport

References

External links

 Searchlight Town Advisory Board

1897 establishments in Nevada
Census-designated places in Clark County, Nevada
Piute Valley
Populated places established in 1897
Populated places in the Mojave Desert
Unincorporated towns in Nevada